Jarqavieh Vosta Rural District is a rural district (dehestan) in Jarqavieh Sofla District, Isfahan County, Isfahan Province, Iran. At the 2006 census, its population was 6,204, in 1,712 families.  The rural district has 6 villages.

References 

Rural Districts of Isfahan Province
Isfahan County